The Germany women's national football team represents Germany in international women's football. The team is governed by the German Football Association (DFB).

The Germany national team is one of the most successful in women's football. They are two-time world champions, having won the 2003 and 2007 tournaments. The team has won eight of the thirteen UEFA European Championships, claiming six consecutive titles between 1995 and 2013. They, along with the Netherlands, are one of the two nations that have won both the women's and men's European tournament. Germany has won Olympic gold in 2016, after three consecutive bronze medals at the Women's Olympic Football Tournament, finishing third in 2000, 2004 and 2008. Birgit Prinz holds the record for most appearances and is the team's all-time leading goalscorer. Prinz has also set international records; she has received the FIFA World Player of the Year award three times and is the joint second overall top goalscorer at the Women's World Cup.

Women's football was long met with skepticism in Germany, and official matches were banned by the DFB until 1970. However, the women's national team has grown in popularity since winning the World Cup in 2003, as it was chosen as Germany's Sports Team of the Year. As of June 2022, Germany is ranked 2nd in the FIFA Women's World Rankings.

History

Early history 
In 1955, the DFB decided to forbid women's football in all its clubs in West Germany. In its explanation, the DFB cited that "this combative sport is fundamentally foreign to the nature of women" and that "body and soul would inevitably suffer damage". Further, the "display of the body violates etiquette and decency". In spite of this ban, more than 150 unofficial international matches were played in the 1950s and 1960s. On 30 October 1970, the ban on women's football was lifted at the DFB annual convention.

Other football associations had already formed official women's national teams in the 1970s, the DFB long remained uninvolved in women's football. In 1981, DFB official Horst R. Schmidt was invited to send a team to the unofficial women's football world championship. Schmidt accepted the invitation but hid the fact that West Germany had no women's national team at the time. To avoid humiliation, the DFB sent the German club champions Bergisch Gladbach 09, who went on to win the tournament and repeat the same feat three years later in 1984. Seeing a need, the DFB established the women's national team in 1982. DFB president Hermann Neuberger appointed Gero Bisanz, an instructor at the Cologne Sports College, to set up the team.

1982–1994: Difficult beginnings and first European titles 
In September 1982, Bisanz organised two scouting training courses from which he selected a squad of 16 players. The team's first international match took place on 10 November 1982 in Koblenz. Following the tradition of the men's team, Switzerland was chosen as West Germany's first opponent. Doris Kresimon scored the first international goal in the 25th minute. In the second half, 18-year-old Silvia Neid contributed two goals to the 5–1 victory; Neid later became the assistant coach in 1996 and the head coach in 2005.

With five draws and one defeat, West Germany failed to qualify for the inaugural 1984 European Championship, finishing third in the qualifying group. In the beginning, Bisanz's primary objective was to close the gap to the Scandinavian countries and Italy – then the strongest teams in Europe. He emphasized training in basic skills and the need for an effective youth programme. Starting in 1985, Bisanz increasingly called-up younger players, but at first had little success with this concept, as West Germany again failed to qualify for the 1987 European Championship finals.

Undefeated and without conceding a goal, the German team qualified for the European Championship for the first time in 1989; the tournament was played on home soil in West Germany. The semi-final against Italy was the first international women's football match shown live on German television. The game was decided by a penalty shootout, in which goalkeeper Marion Isbert saved three penalty kicks and scored the winning penalty herself. On 2 July 1989 in Osnabrück, West Germany played Norway in the final. Before a crowd of 22,000, they beat favourites Norway and won 4–1 with goals from Ursula Lohn, Heidi Mohr and Angelika Fehrmann. This victory marked the team's first international title.

After the German reunification, the East German football association joined the DFB. The East German women's national football team had played only one official international match, losing 0–3 to Czechoslovakia in a friendly match on 9 May 1990. The unified German team defended their title successfully at the 1991 European Championship. After winning all games in the qualifying group, Germany again met Italy in the semi-final, this time winning 3–0. On 14 July 1991, the German team once more faced Norway in the final. The game went to extra time, during which Heidi Mohr and Silvia Neid scored for Germany and secured the 3–1 victory.

In November 1991, Germany participated in the first Women's World Cup in China. Following victories over Nigeria, Taiwan and Italy, the German team reached the quarter-final without conceding a single goal. Silvia Neid scored the first German World Cup goal on 17 November 1991 against Nigeria. Germany won the quarter-final against Denmark 2–1 after extra time, but lost 2–5 in the semi-final to the United States, who went on to win the tournament. Following a 0–4 defeat in the third-place match against Sweden, Germany finished fourth in the tournament.

The German team failed to defend their title at the 1993 European Championship, suffering a semi-final defeat to Italy in a penalty shootout, and later losing 1–3 against Denmark in the third-place playoff. Despite the disappointing result, new talents such as Steffi Jones, Maren Meinert and Silke Rottenberg made their tournament debut and later became key players for the German team.

1995–2002: Olympic and World Cup disappointments 
Birgit Prinz scored in a major tournament for the first time in 1995.
In 1995, Germany won its third European Championship. After winning all qualification matches, scoring 55 goals, the German team defeated England 6–2 over two legs in the semi-final. Germany met Sweden in the final, which was played at the Fritz Walter Stadion in Kaiserslautern, Germany, on 26 March 1995. The Swedish team managed to score early, but Germany came back to win 3–2 with goals from Maren Meinert, Birgit Prinz and Bettina Wiegmann.

At the 1995 Women's World Cup in Sweden, the German team lost against the Scandinavian hosts, but still succeeded in winning their group by beating Japan and Brazil. Germany won the quarter-final against England 3–0, and defeated China 1–0 with a late goal by Bettina Wiegmann in the semi-final. On 18 June 1995 in Stockholm, the German team appeared in their first Women's World Cup final. Facing Norway, they lost the match 0–2, but as runners-up achieved their best World Cup result until then.

Women's football was first played as an Olympic sport at the 1996 Summer Olympics. Bettina Wiegmann scored the first Olympic goal in the opening match against Japan, which Germany won 3–2. After losing their second group game against Norway 2–3, and drawing with Brazil 1–1, Germany was eliminated, finishing third in the group with four points from three matches. Head coach Gero Bisanz resigned after the tournament and his assistant since 1983, Tina Theune, took over as the new national coach. Silvia Neid ended her playing career and was appointed the new assistant coach.

The 1997 European Championship was the first test for new coach Theune. Following a defeat against Norway, Germany finished second in the qualifying group and only secured qualification by beating Iceland in a relegation play-off. After drawing with Italy and Norway, a victory over Denmark in the last group game saw the German team go through to the knockout stage. They beat Sweden 1–0 in the semi-final, and on 12 July 1997, claimed their fourth European championship with a 2–0 win over Italy, with goals from Sandra Minnert and Birgit Prinz.

At the 1999 Women's World Cup in the United States, the German team also failed to qualify directly, but managed to beat the Ukraine in a qualifying play-off. Germany started their World Cup campaign by drawing with Italy and winning 6–0 over Mexico. In the last group game, Germany drew 3–3 against Brazil; by conceding a last minute equalizer, Germany failed to win the group and subsequently had to face the hosts in the quarter-final. With 54,642 people in attendance, among them U.S. President Bill Clinton, the crowd at the Jack Kent Cooke Stadium was the biggest the German team had ever played in front of. Despite leading twice, they lost 2–3 to the eventual World Cup winners.

Germany competed at the 2000 Summer Olympics, winning all three group games against Australia, Brazil and Sweden. The German team dominated the semi-final against Norway, but lost the game 0–1 after an own goal by Tina Wunderlich in the 80th minute. They beat Brazil 2–0 in the third place match with goals from Birgit Prinz and Renate Lingor, and won the bronze medal. It was the first Olympic medal for the German Football Associations since 1988 when the men's team also won bronze.

In 2001, Germany hosted the European Championship. Following victories over Sweden, Russia and England in the group stage, the German team beat Norway 1–0 in the semi-final courtesy of a diving header by Sandra Smisek. On 7 July 2001 in Ulm, they met Sweden in the final, which was played in heavy rain. The game was scoreless after 90 minutes and went to extra time, where Claudia Müller scored a golden goal and secured the fifth European title for Germany.

2003–present: Two consecutive World Cup titles 

At the 2003 Women's World Cup in the United States, Germany was drawn in a group with Canada, Japan and Argentina. After winning all three group games, the German team defeated Russia 7–1 in the quarter-final, which set up another clash with the United States. Germany's Kerstin Garefrekes scored after 15 minutes and goalkeeper Silke Rottenberg made several key saves. In the dying minutes of the semi-final, Maren Meinert and Birgit Prinz sealed the 3–0 win. On 12 October 2003, Germany met Sweden in the World Cup final in Los Angeles. The Scandinavians went ahead before half time, but Maren Meinert equalized shortly after the break. The game went to extra time, where Nia Künzer headed the winning golden goal in the 98th minute to claim Germany's first Women's World Cup title. Birgit Prinz was honoured as the tournament's best player and top goalscorer.

With wins over China and Mexico, the German team finished first in their group at the 2004 Summer Olympics. They beat Nigeria 2–1 in the quarter-final, but suffered a 1–2 semi-final loss to the United States after extra time. In the third place match, Germany defeated Sweden 1–0 with a goal by Renate Lingor, winning the team's second Olympic bronze medal.

The 2005 European Championship was held in England. With wins over Norway, Italy and France in Round 1, the German team advanced to the semi-final, where they defeated Finland 4–1. On 19 June 2005, they met Norway for the third time in the European championship final. Germany won 3–1 with goals from Inka Grings, Renate Lingor and Birgit Prinz and added a sixth European title. Head coach Tina Theune stepped down after the tournament and her assistant Silvia Neid took over as national coach. In 2006, Germany won the annual Algarve Cup for the first time.

As reigning world champion, Germany played the opening game at the 2007 Women's World Cup in China, outclassing Argentina 11–0. After a goalless draw against England and a 2–0 win over Japan, the German team defeated North Korea 3–0 in the quarter-final. They beat Norway by the same result in the semi-final, with goals from Kerstin Stegemann, Martina Müller and a Norwegian own goal. On 30 September 2007, Germany faced Brazil in the World Cup final in Shanghai. Birgit Prinz put Germany in front after half time and goalkeeper Nadine Angerer saved a penalty by Brazilian Marta. Simone Laudehr scored a second goal after 86 minutes, which sealed the German 2–0 victory. Germany was the first team (men's and women's game) to win the World Cup without conceding a goal and the first to successfully defend the Women's World Cup title. With 14 goals, Prinz became the tournament's overall top goalscorer.

In a replay of the 2007 World Cup final, the German team drew 0–0 with Brazil in the opening game at the 2008 Summer Olympics. They then beat both Nigeria and North Korea to advance to the quarter-final, where they defeated Sweden 2–0 after extra time. In the semi-final, Germany again met Brazil. Birgit Prinz scored in the 10th minute, but the German team lost 1–4 after conceding three goals to Brazilian counter-attacks in the second half. They beat Japan 2–0 for the bronze medal, with Fatmire Bajramaj scoring both goals. The third consecutive semi-final loss at the Olympics was seen as a disappointment by both the players and the German press. The team's overall performance and head coach Silvia Neid were harshly criticised in the media.

Germany qualified for the 2009 European Championship in Finland winning all eight games and scoring 34 goals. They beat Norway, France and Iceland in the group stage to advance to the quarter-final, where they won 2–1 against Italy. After trailing Norway at half-time in the semi-final, the German team fought back to a 3–1 victory. On 10 September 2009, they defeated England 6–2 for their seventh European trophy. Birgit Prinz and Inka Grings scored twice, with Melanie Behringer and Kim Kulig also scoring. Grings retained her award as the tournament's top scorer from 2005, while Germany extended their winning streak at the European Championship finals to a 19-match run dating back to 1997.

Germany hosted the 2011 FIFA Women's World Cup and won the three games on the group stage, over Canada, France and Nigeria. On the quarterfinals, the team suffered an upset by Japan, who won on overtime with a goal by Karina Maruyama. The defeat broke the Germans' streak of sixteen undefeated games at the World Cup. By failing to finish among the top two UEFA teams, Germany was unable to qualify for the 2012 Summer Olympics.

At the 2013 European Championship in Sweden, the Germans won their sixth straight continental title, with the decisive game being a 1–0 victory over Norway. Goalkeeper Nadine Angerer, who stopped two penalties during the final, was chosen as the tournament's best player. The 2015 FIFA Women's World Cup had Germany again reaching the top four. In the semi-final against the United States, Célia Šašić, who wound up as the tournament's top scorer, missed a penalty, and afterwards goals by Carli Lloyd and Kelley O'Hara lead to an American victory. The third place match saw the Germans lose their first ever match to England after 21 contests, due to a penalty kick by Fara Williams during extra time.

At the 2019 Women's World Cup Germany were in Group B with China PR, South Africa, and Spain. They topped the group with three wins and defeated Nigeria in the Round of 16. Germany was eliminated by Sweden in the quarter-finals, losing to them for the first time in 24 years and conceding their only goals of the tournament and so failed to qualify for the Olympic football tournament of Tokyo 2020.

At the 2022 European Championship Germany reached the final, where the team lost after extra time with 1–2 against the host of the tournament, England. For Germany, the record winners of the competition, this was their ninth appearance in a Euro final and the first in which they got defeated.

Team image

Nicknames 
The Germany women's national football team has been known or nicknamed as "Die Nationalelf (The National Eleven)".

Kits and crest 

The German women's national football team wears white shirts with black shorts and white socks, following the tradition of the German men's team – black and white are the colours of Prussia. The current change kit is all dark green. In the past, Germany also used green shirts with white shorts and green socks as the away kit, as well as a red and black kit, with black shorts and red socks.

The women's national team originally played with the emblem of the German men's team, a variation of the DFB logo with the Federal Eagle of Germany (Bundesadler) and three stars at the top for the men's 1954, 1974 and 1990 World Cup titles. Since their first Women's World Cup win in 2003, the team displays its own World Cup titles; initially with one star, and since 2007, with two stars at the top of the emblem. While being reigning world champions, Germany also displayed the newly created "FIFA Women's World Champions Badge" on their shirts from 2009 until 2011 when they were succeeded by Japan.

For the 2019 FIFA Women's World Cup, the team kit featured white socks, black shorts, and a primarily white jersey with a distorted version of a waving German flag rendered in black, red, and gold.

The current kit features a white crewneck jersey with a black horizontal pinstripe and the colors of the German flag at the sleeves.

In accordance with the rules of the International Olympic Committee, Germany does not wear its official uniform with the logo of the German Football Association while competing at the Summer Olympics. Instead, the DFB badge is replaced by the coat of arms of Germany. Like all DFB squads, the women's national team is supplied by Adidas, which had provided a specifically designed female football jersey since 1999. The team's main sponsor is the German insurance company Allianz.

Home stadium 
The Germany national football team has no national stadium. Like the men, the women's team play their home matches in different stadiums throughout the country. As of June 2011, they have played in 87 different German cities. Most home games have been held in Osnabrück with six matches, followed by Ulm (five games), and Bochum, Kaiserslautern, Koblenz, Lüdenscheid, Rheine, Siegen and Weil am Rhein (three games each). The first home match in former East Germany was played in Aue in May 1991.

In the 1980s and 1990s, home matches were mostly played in smaller towns with no professional football clubs. As the team became more successful, especially after the World Cup win in 2003, the number of spectators rose accordingly. Today, the team usually plays in stadiums with 10,000 to 25,000 seats. The ten largest German cities have only hosted five international matches. The team have played twice in Frankfurt and Berlin, and once Hamburg. Bremen, Dortmund, Düsseldorf, Essen, Cologne, Munich and Stuttgart have never hosted an international match of the women's team.

Outside Germany, they have played the most games in Faro, Portugal (10 matches), and Guangzhou, China (six matches), the host cities of the annual Algarve Cup and the Four Nations Tournament respectively. They have also played five games in Albufeira, Portugal (also an Algarve Cup venue), and four times in Minneapolis in the United States.

The record attendance for Germany was 73,680 in the 2011 Women's World Cup opening game against Canada at the Olympic Stadium in Berlin. That game also set a new European record in women's football. Away from home, the team's crowd record was 54,642 in the 1999 Women's World Cup quarter-final against the United States at the Jack Kent Cooke Stadium in Landover.

Acceptance and popularity 
For most of the 20th century, women's football was a niche sport in Germany and was frowned upon. When the DFB appointed Gero Bisanz to coach the newly founded women's national team, he was initially very reluctant about his assignment and feared it would harm his reputation. Winning the 1989 European Championship was the team's first international success, but it had little lasting effect on their popularity. As a gift for the first European trophy, every player received a tea set, which is often cited as an example of male chauvinism and general lack of interest in the women's national team at that time. This attitude within the German Football Association has changed considerably in the last two decades, in particular during the term of Theo Zwanziger as DFB president, an outspoken supporter of women's football.
Each member of the 2003 Women's World Cup squad received a prearranged bonus of 15,000 euros for winning the tournament; four years later the players received 50,000 euros for their successful title defense. In 2009, one million of the 6.7 million DFB members were female.

The 2003 World Cup title marked the breakthrough for the women's national football team in Germany. The final was watched by 10.48 million viewers on German television (a 33.2 percent market share) and the German team was welcomed home by almost 10,000 fans at Frankfurt's city hall. Later that year, they were honoured as the 2003 German Sports Team of the Year. Nia Künzer's World Cup winning golden goal was voted Germany's 2003 Goal of the Year, the first time the award was won by a female player. Since 2005, almost all of the women's national football team's matches have been shown live on German television.

The final of the 2007 Women's World Cup was seen by 9.05 million television viewers (a 50.5 percent market share). After the team returned to Germany, they were celebrated by a crowd of 20,000 in Frankfurt. In December 2007, all players of the World Cup squad received the Silberne Lorbeerblatt (Silver Laurel Leaf), the highest state decoration for athletes in Germany. National coach Silvia Neid was awarded the Federal Cross of Merit on ribbon by German president Horst Köhler.

In 2009, the team's six home matches had an average attendance of 22,753. In a survey of German football fans, 65 percent of the male and 62 percent of the female respondents said they were interested in women's football. However, this popularity is mostly limited to international matches. Although the number of spectators in the women's Bundesliga has more than doubled since 2003, the average attendance in the 2007–08 season (887) was still less than three percent of that of the men's Bundesliga (38,612).

Women's football is socially accepted in Germany, although one of the main points of criticism remains the alleged lack of quality compared to the men's game. The German women's national team has played several exhibition matches against male teams, most notably losing 0–3 to the VfB Stuttgart Under-17 squad in preparation for the 2003 World Cup. Most German players dismiss comparisons between the quality of men's and women's football; Renate Lingor has said they are "two entirely different sports". Players such as Simone Laudehr, Ariane Hingst and Melanie Behringer have stated that men's football is played at a slightly higher pace, but also has more interruptions and tackling than the women's game. Linda Bresonik has said she generally prefers to watch men's football.

Results and fixtures 

The following is a list of match results in the last 12 months, as well as any future matches that have been scheduled.

Legend

2022

2023

Coaching staff

Current technical staff

Manager history 

*Key: P–games played, W–games won, D–games drawn; L–games lost, %–win percentage. Statistics as of 21 February 2023.

Former German international Martina Voss-Tecklenburg is the current head coach of the German women's national football team. The coach's official title is DFB-Trainer and he or she is employed by the German Football Association.

Gero Bisanz (1982–1996) was the first coach of the women's national team. He selected his first squad in September 1982. At the same time, he also worked as the chief instructor for DFB coaching training from 1971 to 2000. Bisanz led the German team to three European Championships in 1989, 1991 and 1995. Under Bisanz, Germany also was runner-up at the 1995 Women's World Cup. He resigned after the German team was eliminated in Round 1 at the 1996 Summer Olympics. With his assistant since 1983, Tina Theune, he built a scouting system and was responsible for a new DFB youth programme.
Tina Theune (1996–2005) took over as head coach after the 1996 Summer Olympics. She was the first woman to acquire the highest German football coaching license. Theune was responsible for three European Championship titles in 1997, 2001 and 2005. During her time as head coach, Germany won the bronze medal at the 2000 and 2004 Summer Olympics. Her biggest success was the 2003 Women's World Cup title. Theune is the most successful national coach to date. She benefited from an effective youth programme and integrated several Under-19 players into the nation team. Theune stepped down after winning the European Championship in 2005.
Silvia Neid (2005–2016) was the team's assistant coach from 1996 to 2005 and the head coach of the German Under-19 team, winning the 2004 U-19 Women's World Championship. In July 2005, she became the team's head coach and the 2006 Algarve Cup marked her first tournament win. By winning the 2007 Women's World Cup, Neid became the first Germany national team coach of either gender to win the World Cup at the first attempt. At her first Summer Olympics as a coach in 2008, Germany won the bronze medal for a third time. Neid was also responsible for Germany's seventh European Championship in 2009. She coached the Germany national team until 2016 and her assistant was Ulrike Ballweg.
 On 30 March 2015, DFB announced that Steffi Jones (2016–2018) would become the new German head coach in 2016.
 Horst Hrubesch (2018) took over as the interim head coach from March to November 2018.
 Martina Voss-Tecklenburg (2019–) then became the new coach in 2019.

Players

Current squad 

The following players were named for the friendly match against the Sweden on 21 February 2023.

Caps and goals as of 21 February 2023.

Recent call-ups 
The following players were named to a squad in the last 12 months.

Notes:
 : Preliminary squad / standby

Records 

Players in bold are still active, at least at club level.

Birgit Prinz, a former team captain who retired after the 2011 World Cup, holds the record for Germany for appearances, having played 214 times from 1994 to 2011. She is one of 21 German players to have reached 100 caps. Kerstin Stegemann is second, having played 191 times. Bettina Wiegmann, Germany's team captain during the 2003 World Cup win, comes fourth with 154 games. Prinz exceeded Wiegmann's record as the most capped player in November 2006. Prinz also held the record for most appearances by a European player until 15 June 2021, when she was surpassed by Sweden's Caroline Seger

Wiegmann and Prinz have successively been awarded the title of honorary captain of the German women's national football team.

The title of Germany's highest goalscorer is also held by Prinz. She scored her first goal in July 1994 against Canada and finished her career with 128 goals (averaging 0.60 goals per game). Heidi Mohr, as well as being the second-highest scorer, is also the most prolific with 83 goals coming from 104 games (averaging 0.80 goals per game). Two players share the record for goals scored in one match: Conny Pohlers scored five goals in October 2001 against Portugal, and Inka Grings scored five times in February 2004, again facing Portugal. Silvia Neid, the former Germany national coach, is the sixth highest goalscorer with 48 goals in 111 games.

The largest margin of victory achieved by Germany is 17–0 against Kazakhstan during a European Championship qualifying game in November 2011. The record defeat, a 0–6 deficit against the United States, occurred during a friendly match in March 1996.

Former goalkeeper Nadine Angerer has the most appearances for a goalkeeper, with 145 games as goal keeper (89 without conceding a goal) and one game as a substitute as defender.
Silke Rottenberg is second with 126 caps and 68 games without conceding a goal. Bettina Wiegmann holds the record of 14 goals from penalty kicks; Renate Lingor comes in second with 8 goals. Tina Wunderlich scored the team's only own goal in the semi-final of the 2000 Summer Olympics against Norway; it was the game's only goal.

The German team also holds several international records. In 2007, they were the first to win two consecutive Women's World Cup titles and they achieved the then-biggest win in tournament history by beating Argentina 11–0, Germany is also the only team to win the women's World Cup without conceding a goal and the only country to win both World Cups. With 14 goals, Prinz became the overall top goalscorer at the Women's World Cup in 2007, and she and Brazilian Marta are the only women to have received the FIFA World Player of the Year award at least three times.

Competitive record

FIFA Women's World Cup 

Germany is one of the most successful nations at the FIFA Women's World Cup, having won the tournament twice and finishing runner-up once. The German team won the World Cup in 2003 and 2007. At the first World Cup in 1991, they finished in fourth place. In 1995, Germany reached the World Cup final, but were defeated by Norway. The team's worst results were quarter-final losses to the United States in 1999, Japan in 2011 and Sweden in 2019. Overall, the German team has appeared in three Women's World Cup finals, and is a five-time semi-finalist. They have participated in every Women's World Cup and have a 30–5–9 win–draw–loss record.

*Denotes draws including knockout matches decided on penalty kicks.
**Gold background colour indicates that the tournament was won.
***Red border color indicates tournament was held on home soil.

Olympic Games 
Women's football debuted at the 1996 Summer Olympics and Bettina Wiegmann scored the first Olympic goal in the opening game of the tournament. However, Germany failed to progress to the knockout stage and was eliminated after Round 1. Four years later the German team won the bronze medal at the 2000 Summer Olympics. They again finished third at both the 2004 and the 2008 Summer Olympics.

The German team has qualified for all Women's Olympic Football Tournaments until 2008. However, they failed to qualify for the 2012 tournament as UEFA used the 2011 World Cup for qualification, and Germany ended below France and Sweden. The German team beat Sweden in the Olympics final in Rio in 2016 to obtain their first Olympic gold medal.

UEFA Women's Championship 

Germany failed to qualify for the first two UEFA European Championships in 1984 and 1987. Since 1989, the German team has participated in every tournament and is the record European champion with eight titles. Germany has won six consecutive championships from 1995 to 2013 and has an overall 31–6–3 win–draw–loss record. The worst German result at the European championship finals was finishing fifth in 2017.

*Denotes draws including knockout matches decided on penalty kicks.
**Gold background colour indicates that the tournament was won.
***Red border color indicates tournament was held on home soil.
****Missing flag indicates no host country; tournament was played in two-leg knockout rounds (with the exception of the 1995 final).

Honours

Major competitions 
FIFA Women's World Cup
 Champions: 2003, 2007
 Runners-up: 1995
 Fourth place: 1991, 2015

UEFA Women's Championship
 Champions: 1989, 1991, 1995, 1997, 2001, 2005, 2009, 2013
 Runners-up: 2022
 Fourth place: 1993

Summer Olympic Games
 Gold Medal: 2016
 Bronze Medal: 2000, 2004, 2008

Minor competitions 
Algarve Cup
 Champions: 2006, 2012, 2014, 2020
 Runners-up: 2005, 2010, 2013
 Third place: 2015
 Fourth place: 2002, 2008, 2009

Women's World Invitational Tournament
 Champions: 1981, 1984
 Third place: 1987

SheBelieves Cup
 Runners-up: 2016, 2017
 Fourth place: 2018

Four Nations Tournament
 Runners-up: 2002
 Third place: 2003, 2005, 2007

Mundialito Cup
 Runners-up: 1984

Arnold Clark Cup
 Fourth place: 2022

Awards 
FIFA Women's World Cup Fair Play Trophy
 Winners: 1991

FIFA Women's World Cup Most Entertaining Team
 Winners: 2003

Titles

See also 

Sport in Germany
Football in Germany
Women's football in Germany
Germany women's national football team
Germany women's national football team results
List of Germany women's international footballers
Germany women's national youth football team
Germany women's national under-23 football team
Germany women's national under-21 football team
Germany women's national under-20 football team
Germany women's national under-19 football team
Germany women's national under-17 football team

Notes

References

External links 

Germany women's national football team – official website at DFB 
FIFA profile

 
FIFA Women's World Cup-winning countries
European women's national association football teams
Recipients of the Silver Laurel Leaf
UEFA Women's Championship-winning countries